Four's a Crowd is a 2022 Spanish road movie with romantic comedy elements directed by Álex de la Iglesia, starring Alberto San Juan, Blanca Suárez, Ernesto Alterio and Rubén Cortada.

Plot 
In the wake of using a car-sharing mobile app to cope with his economic problems, Julián, a divorced man, meets Lorena, whom he begins to travel with to Madrid on a regular basis in his Volvo XC60, falling romantically for her. He is about to open up his feelings in one of those travels, but the situation takes an unexpected turn because of the selection of the rest of passengers.

Cast

Production 
Jorge Guerricaechevarría took over co-writing duties alongside director Álex de la Iglesia.  was charged with the direction of photography. The film is a Telecinco Cinema, Pokeepsie Films and Te Has Venido Arriba AIE production and it had the participation of Mediaset España, Movistar+ and Mediterráneo Mediaset España Group. Filming began on 25 January 2021. Shooting locations included Bilbao (marking De la Iglesia's film return to his native city after his feature debut Acción mutante), Álava, La Rioja, and Madrid. The production was temporarily halted due to a COVID-19 positive test.

Release 
Distributed by Sony Pictures Entertainment Iberia S.L.U., the film was set for a 4 November 2022 theatrical release date in Spain, then re-scheduled to 28 October. It was the largest opening of the weekend (and it made the second-largest grossing overall after Black Adam).

Reception 
Raquel Hernández Luján of HobbyConsolas rated the film with 78 points ("good"), deeming it to be a "funny, surprising and at times even delirious" comedy, as well as an "anti-buddy movie that makes you laugh", highlighting the character design, the plot twists and the full commitment to their roles on the part of the two "immense" San Juan and Alterio as the best things about the film, while citing certain "trite" elements pertaining the romantic comedy subplot as a negative point.

Fausto Fernández of Fotogramas rated the film 4 out of 5 stars highlighting the duel held between San Juan and Alterio, "worthy of The Hitcher... or Planes, Trains and Automobiles" as the film's standout.

Miguel Ángel Romero of Cinemanía rated the film 2 out of 5 stars deeming it to be an "endless and fun trip in BlaBlaCar, [yet] too trite".

Sergi Sánchez of La Razón rated the film 3 out of 5 stars, highlighting the reformulation of the romcom genre under a road movie structure (which manages to "work and entertain") as the best thing about the film, while dismissing the fiction taking place in a hotel, slowing down the pace, as the worst thing about it.

Accolades 

|-
| rowspan = "2" align = "center" | 2023 || rowspan = "1" | 10th Feroz Awards || colspan = "2" | Best Comedy Film ||  || rowspan = "1" | 
|-
| 78th CEC Medals || Best Music || Roque Baños ||  || align = "center" | 
|}

See also 
 List of Spanish films of 2022

Informational notes

References 

2022 films
2022 comedy films
Films set in Spain
Spanish road movies
Spanish comedy road movies
2020s Spanish films
2022 adventure films
2022 romantic comedy films
2020s road movies
Films shot in Bilbao
Films shot in Madrid
Films directed by Álex de la Iglesia
Films scored by Roque Baños
Spanish romantic comedy films
Telecinco Cinema films